This article lists the rolling stock of the Shanghai Metro, a rapid transit system serving Shanghai. The table below contain the 1,190 trains with 7,394 carriages on the Shanghai Metro operational .

Standard gauge is used throughout the network, allowing new train equipment to be transported over the Chinese rail network which uses the same gauge. In contrast to many other metro systems in the world, the Shanghai Metro uses overhead wires for the power supply, except for line 16, line 17 and Pujiang line which use third rail. All lines with overhead wires are DC1500V overhead wires. The overhead wires is divided into overhead catenary and overhead conductor rails. Except for the earlier construction of lines 1-4, all underground sections are powered by overhead conductor rails, and the rest are powered by overhead catenary.

Power supply
Shanghai Metro has set up 110kV main transformer station, subordinate AC33～35kV traction transformer station, AC10kV station transformer station (output three-phase four-line AC400V), and new line station uses AC35kV step-down substation (output three-phase four-line AC400V). The traction transformer station is a subordinate AC33kV to AC1250V transformer station, and an AC1250V rectifier station. After rectification, the voltage rises to DC1500V to DC1800V, and then it is transmitted to the overhead wires. The station uses AC220V for lighting and AC400V for large equipment. Shanghai Rail Transit usually uses an inter-area two-way power supply mode.

On line 2, Siemens Transportation Systems equipped the line with an overhead contact line (cantilever material: galvanized steel) and 7 DC traction power supply substations.

Train sets
Initially, Siemens (global market share: 14%), Alstom (global market share: 18%) and Bombardier (global market share: 23%) directly sold the A-type subway trains to China, and then moved their production bases to China to produce and assemble the A-type trains by cooperating with large Chinese locomotive manufacturers. Shanghai Electric and Alstom set up a joint venture company, Shanghai Alstom Transportation Equipment Co., Ltd., Changchun Railway Passenger Vehicle Co., Ltd. and Bombardier set up a joint venture company, and Zhuzhou Electric Locomotive Co., Ltd. cooperated with Siemens. On September 22, 2007 the first A-type subway train with independent intellectual property rights was produced at the production base of Rail Transit Equipment Company in Minhang.

Signalling and telecommunication
In the beginning lines were built in an era where moving block CBTC systems were expensive and China had no experience with them. Therefore, lines 1-5 had fixed block CBTC systems capable of headways above 2.5 minutes. Lines 1, 3, 4, and 5 used ALSTOM URBALIS 200, line 2 uses Union Switch & Signal (now Ansaldo STS USA) AF900. Lines 1, 2, and 5 have updated there system to equip with moving block CBTC. All Shanghai Metro lines -except lines 3 and 4 undergoing an upgrade between June 28, 2021 and 2025 - are equipped with moving block CBTC systems capable of headways as low as 90 seconds.

Lines 1 and 2 use CASCO, lines 5 and 14 use Thales, Shanghai Electric TSTCBTC2.0, lines 6, 7, 8, 9, 11 use THALES SelTrac 
lines 10, 12, 13, 15, 16, 18 use ALSTOM Urbalis Line 17 uses CASCO TRANAVI and Pujiang line uses Bombardier CITYFLO 650.

Rolling stock pictures

List of rolling stock in operation

List of rolling stock previously in operation

Depots and parking lots
Shanghai Metro has 13 depots and 15 parking lots.
Also undertakes advanced maintenance of line 2 trains and line 1 01A05 type train. There is a connection line with Shanghai-Kunming Railway.
  Fujin Road Parking Lot: Located on the west side of Yunchuan Road, Fujin Road, Baoshan District, and northwest of terminal station  used for parking and maintenance. It was officially completed on December 18, 2007. The parking lot can park 54 8-carriage subway trains at the same time, covering an area of ​​about 30 square meters (at the time the largest subway parking lot in Asia. 
It is used for parking and maintenance. There is a connection line between lines 2 and 7.
It was put in operations in 2009 and currently used for the parking and maintenance of line 2 and line 13 trains. There is a connection line between lines 2 and 13.
It is currently used for the parking and maintenance of line 3 trains and has a connection line with the Shanghai-Kunming Railway.
  North Jiangyang Road Depot (sometimes referred as Baogang Depot): Located on the east side of Fujin Road, North Jiangyang Road, Baoshan District, and southeast of terminal station ; used for parking and maintenance of line 3 trains. Also undertakes advanced maintenance work for line 4 trains.
  Pingzhuang Highway Depot: Located on the southwest side of Jinhai Road intersection of Pingzhuang Highway, Fengxian District; south of the terminal station . It is used for parking and maintenance.
There is a connection line between lines 6 and 10.
It was originally scheduled to be used for the parking and maintenance of line 11 trains, but this was cancelled due to the adjustment of the north-south dividing point of line 11 (now Chuanyanghe Parking Lot is in use of line 11).
Chentai Road parking lot and Xincun Road control center are shared with other lines of Shanghai Metro. There is a connection line between line 7 and 15.
  Yinhang Depot: Located on the north side of terminal station , Yinhang City; used for parking and maintenance of line 8 trains. It has a connection line with the railway Nanhe branch line.
  Pujiang Town Parking Lot: Located on the east side of Shanghai Puxing Highway, the north side of Shenjiahu Highway, the west side of Sanlu Highway, and southeast  (south of Pujiang line); used for parking and maintenance of line 8 and Pujiang trains. 
Although it is close to Shanghai-Hangzhou Railway, there is no connection line and new trains need to be transported into the depot using a flatbed truck.
It is used for parking and maintenance of line 9, 12 and 14 trains. There is a connection line between lines 9, 12, and 14.
Covering an area of ​​about 23.4 hectares. Used for parking and maintenance of line 10 trains. The parking lot has been built as an open-top project "Shanghai New Speed ​​Metro Dynamic Museum", which is the current Shanghai Metro Museum.
Used for parking and maintenance of line 11 trains.
Used for parking and maintenance of line 11, 13 and 16 trains. There is a connection line between lines 11, 13 and 16.
It covers an area of ​​about 26.67 hectares and is used for the parking and maintenance of line 11 trains.
  Zhongchun Road Parking Lot: Located on the northwest side of the intersection of Gudai Road and the Shanghai-Hangzhou Railway and on the west side of terminal station , covering an area of 13.35 hectares. It is the parking lot for line 12 trains. There is a connection line with the Shanghai-Hangzhou Railway.
  Fengbang Depot: Located in the area west of Fengbang River, south of Cao'an Road, west of railway line, and north of G2 expressway. It will also serve the planned Jiamin Line.
  Yuanjiang Road Depot: Located to the west of Lianhua South Road and north of Zhuanxing East Road.
Used for the parking and maintenance of line 16 trains. It is planned to also be used for the parking and maintenance of line 2 trains. There is a track with both the catenary and third rail at the entrance and exit of the depot for trains to switch over as line 16 uses third rail for power supply on the main line and catenary for power supply in the depot. Also the test line in the depot is also equipped with a catenary and a third rail.
  Xujing Depot: Located on the south side of Songze Avenue and on the east side of Xule Road; 
  Zhujiajiao Parking Lot (: Located on the south of Huqingping Highway and Huqingping Expressway North side.
It is the parking lot for line 18 trains.

Notes

References 

Rolling stock
Lists of rolling stock